Princess Hteik Su Phaya Gyi (5 April 1923 – 31 December 2021), also known as Su Su Khin or Pwar May or Princess Tessie, was a Burmese princess and the final surviving royal of the Konbaung dynasty. Daughter of Princess Myat Phaya Galay, a daughter of the last king of Burma, she was a senior member of the Royal House of Konbaung.

Upon the death of her younger brother Taw Phaya in 2019, she became the last living grandchild of King Thibaw.

Life

Hteik Su Phaya Gyi was born on 5 April 1923 in Rangoon, British Burma, to Ko Ko Naing and Princess Myat Phaya Galay, the fourth daughter of King Thibaw and Queen Supayalat. She went to a Catholic school in Moulmein and was employed at the U.S. and Australian embassies in Rangoon.

In 1936, Hteik Su Phaya Gyi received an offer of engagement to King Ananda Mahidol of Thailand, elder brother of the late King Bhumibol Adulyadej, leading to widespread expectations that she would be the future queen consort. She sought to bring King Thibaw's body back to Myanmar as part of her family's mission.

In 1943, she married Maung Maung Khin, a descendant of the Mon royal family, who was a nephew of the Premier Ba Maw and a brother of Khin Kyi, wife of her younger brother Taw Phaya Gyi. Maung Maung Khin died at Rangoon in 1984.

She died on 31 December 2021 at a Buddhist monastery in Yangon, at the age of 98. Her funeral was held at Yayway Cemetery in Yangon on 2 January 2022. She was survived by twenty grandchildren and seventeen great-grandchildren.

Documentary film
In 2017, Hteik Su Phaya Gyi and her younger brother Taw Phaya, her nephew Soe Win, and her niece Devi Thant Sin appeared as the main characters of We Were Kings, a documentary film by Alex Bescoby and Max Jones. The film premiered in Mandalay on 4 November 2017 at the Irrawaddy Literary Festival and also screened in Thailand at the Foreign Correspondents' Club of Thailand. The film is about Myanmar's history, but also about the descendants of the last kings of Burma who lived unassuming lives in modern Myanmar, unrecognized and unknown.

Family
She had three sons and two daughters: Win Khin (b. 1945), Kyaw Khin (b. 1948), Aung Khin (1953 – October 2008), Cho Cho Khin (b. 1943), and Devi Khin (b. 1951).

Ancestry
Source:

References

External links 
 Myanmar Royals Through Sudha Shah's Book: The King in Exile

1923 births
2021 deaths
Burmese princesses
Konbaung dynasty
People from Yangon Region